Petra Mandula and Elena Tatarkova were the defending champions, but Tatarkova didn't play in 2004. 

Mandula successfully defended her title, playing with Barbara Schett.

Results

Seeds

  Petra Mandula /  Barbara Schett (champions)
  Iveta Benešová /  Ľubomíra Kurhajcová (semifinals)
  Bryanne Stewart /  Samantha Stosur (quarterfinals)
  Zsófia Gubacsi /  Kira Nagy (quarterfinals)

Draw

References

Tippmix Budapest Grand Prix - Doubles
Budapest Grand Prix